Poly-Currents is an album by American jazz drummer Elvin Jones recorded in 1969 and released on the Blue Note label. Some of the musicians include tenor saxophonists Joe Farrell and George Coleman, baritone saxophonist Pepper Adams, conguero Candido Camero and bassist Wilbur Little.

Reception
The Allmusic review by Scott Yanow awarded the album 4½ stars calling it "Advanced modal hard bop with all of the musicians playing in top form".

Track listing
 "Agenda" (Elvin Jones) - 13:50
 "Agappe Love" (Joe Farrell) - 5:52
 "Mr. Jones" (Keiko Jones) - 7:37
 "Yes" (Fred Tompkins) - 2:23
 "Whew" (Wilbur Little) - 9:34

Personnel
Elvin Jones - drums
Fred Tompkins - flute (#5)
George Coleman - tenor saxophone (#1-4)
Joe Farrell - tenor saxophone, English horn, flute, bass flute
Pepper Adams - baritone saxophone (#1-3)
Wilbur Little - bass
Candido Camero - congas (#1-3)

References

Blue Note Records albums
Elvin Jones albums
1970 albums
Albums produced by Francis Wolff
Albums recorded at Van Gelder Studio